The 2004 Grote Prijs Jef Scherens was the 38th edition of the Grote Prijs Jef Scherens cycle race and was held on 5 September 2004. The race started and finished in Leuven. The race was won by Allan Johansen.

General classification

References

2004
2004 in road cycling
2004 in Belgian sport